Unión Deportiva Las Palmas, S.A.D. is a Spanish football team based in Las Palmas, on the island of Gran Canaria in the autonomous community of Canary Islands. Founded on 22 August 1949, it plays in Segunda División, holding home games at the Estadio Gran Canaria, with a capacity of 32,400 seats. The club traditionally play in yellow shirts with blue shorts and socks.

The club remains the only one in Spanish football to achieve back-to-back promotions to La Liga in its first two seasons. It had a 19-year run in the competition, ending in 1982–83. They have been promoted to La Liga on three additional occasions since that time (a total of eight additional seasons), most recently from 2015 to 2018.

Its main rivals are Tenerife from said neighbouring island. Las Palmas and Tenerife contest the Canary Islands derby. The two clubs are among the most isolated professional football clubs in Europe, since they play their away games on the distant Spanish mainland.

History

Foundation and early years

Even though the club registered with the Royal Spanish Football Federation on 6 June 1949, UD Las Palmas was officially founded on 22 August of that year, as the result of a merger between all five clubs on the island: Club Deportivo Gran Canaria, Atlético Club de Fútbol, Real Club Victoria, Arenas Club and Marino Fútbol Club. The union was to create a club strong enough to keep Canarian players on the island and not to seek a better career on the mainland.

Debate was held on the name of the club, which it was agreed would not include the names of any of its predecessors. An early option, Deportivo Canarias, was scrapped due to referring to the Canary Islands on a whole rather than the island of Gran Canaria. The name Las Palmas by itself was also put forward, and then rejected due to the name having already been taken by a defunct club in the city; Unión Deportiva Las Palmas was finally chosen due to its connection to the union which created the team, and its home city of Las Palmas. The first training session at the new club was held on 16 September 1949.

Las Palmas finished second in their first season in the Tercera División (1949–50), ranking third in the following year's Segunda División to reach La Liga for the first time ever, and became the first Spanish club to achieve consecutive promotions in its first two years of existence. The first season in the top flight ended, however, in relegation, but the team returned to the category in 1954, going on to enjoy a six-year spell.

Top-flight success
After Las Palmas returned to La Liga at the end of the 1963–64 season, again as champions, the club went on to have their most successful spell in the competition. Managed by Vicente Dauder, they finished third in 1967–68 behind Real Madrid and FC Barcelona, and four club players made the Spain squad which hosted and won the UEFA Euro 1964 tournament; the following season the team fared even better and only lost the league to Real Madrid, and thus qualified for European competition for the first time in its history, appearing in the 1969–70 Inter-Cities Fairs Cup and being knocked out in the first round by Germany's Hertha BSC (0–0 home draw, 0–1 away loss).

Las Palmas player Juan Guedes died suddenly on 9 March 1971 at the age of 28. The next season, French coach Pierre Sinibaldi led the club to the fifth place, with subsequent qualification for the UEFA Cup: after disposing of Torino F.C. and ŠK Slovan Bratislava, the Spaniards bowed out to Dutch club FC Twente; at the end of 1974–75 another team player, Tonono – a defender who played with Guedes – died of a liver infection.

Las Palmas' third appearance in European competition came with the 1977–78 UEFA Cup, where they defeated FK Sloboda Tuzla of Yugoslavia in the first round before falling to the English side Ipswich Town. Under the management of Miguel Muñoz, and with players such as Argentines Miguel Ángel Brindisi, Daniel Carnevali (the first to arrive in 1973), Carlos Morete and Quique Wolff, the club also reached their first final of the Copa del Rey in that year, losing on 19 April to Barcelona at the Santiago Bernabéu Stadium (1–3).

From the 1990s onwards, Las Palmas played mainly in the Segunda División, but also spent six years in Segunda División B – the new third level created in 1977 – and, from 2000 to 2002, competed in the top flight. On 3 October 2001 the side managed a 4–2 home win against Real Madrid, with youth product Rubén Castro scoring two goals for the hosts, but the season ended nonetheless in relegation. On 22 December 2001, Las Palmas played its 1,000th game in La Liga. In the 2009–10 season in Segunda División the club finished 17th, just one point away from being relegated to Segunda División B. On 21 June 2015, Las Palmas was promoted back to La Liga after defeating Real Zaragoza on the away goals rule.

Ciudad deportiva
The Ciudad Deportiva UD Las Palmas, also known as Barranco Seco, is the training ground of UD Las Palmas. Occupying a total area of 70,000 m², the complex is located in the area known as Barranco Seco at the southern outskirts of the city of Las Palmas.

History and construction
The current land in Barranco Seco was acquired by UD Las Palmas during the 1960s by the efforts of then club director Manuel Betancor. During the 1970s, there was only a single training pitch used by the reserve and junior teams of the club. In 1982, when the ground was upgraded to be used as a training field by the first team.

In June 2015, the Ciudad Deportiva project was initiated. However, works did not start until 2017. After around 2 years of construction works, the complex was finally opened on July 8, 2019. It was designed by architect Juan Palop-Casado, who assured that the construction of this project was "an attempt that has been made to build with the greatest possible sustainability". The construction was executed by "Construcciones Alex y Nadal, S.L.", involving around 380 workers, 10,000 tons of sand, nearly 300 tons of steel, almost 2,000 cubic meters of concrete and beams of approximately 1,600 meters.

Being only the first phase of the entire sports city project, the club invested 22.5 million euros of its own funds to carry out the construction works of the current facilities. The construction of a multifunctional service building is scheduled in the second phase. The eventual area of the complex will become 70,000 m² after the completion of the second phase.

Facilities
The new complex has modern changing rooms, a meeting hall, a gym with physiotherapy facilities, a dining room, a press room, in addition to two parking spaces designated for 130 vehicles. The Ciudad Deportiva is home to 3 regular size training pitches:
Ernesto Aparicio training field of natural grass.
David García Santana training field of natural grass.
Manuel Betancor training field of artificial turf, designated for the training sessions of UD Las Palmas Atlético and UD Las Palmas C; the reserve teams of the club.

Seasons

Season to season

34 seasons in La Liga
33 seasons in Segunda División
6 seasons in Segunda División B
1 season in Tercera División

Recent seasons

European cup history

Current squad
.

Reserve team

Out on loan

Current technical staff

Honours
La Liga
Runners-up (1): 1968–69

Segunda División
 Winners (4): 1953–54, 1963–64, 1984–85, 1999–00

Segunda División B
 Winners (2): 1992–93, 1995–96

Copa del Rey
Runners-up (1): 1978

Former players

List of coaches

 Satur Grech (1953–57)
 Luis Molowny (1957–58)
 Baltasar Albéniz (1958–59)
 Luis Molowny (1959)
 Marcel Domingo (1959–60)
 Paco Campos (1961–62)
 Rosendo Hernández (1962–63)
 Vicente Dauder (1963–66)
 Luis Molowny (1968–70)
 Rosendo Hernández (1970)
 Héctor Rial (1970–71)
 Pierre Sinibaldi (1971–75)
 Heriberto Herrera (1975–76)
 Roque Olsen (1976–77)
 Miguel Muñoz (1977–79)
 Antonio Ruiz (1979–80)
 Heriberto Herrera (1982)
 Walter Skocik (1982–83)
 Héctor Núñez (1983–84)
 Roque Olsen (1984–85)
 Ferenc Kovács (1986–87)
 Roque Olsen (1988)
 Paquito (1989–90)
 Manolo Cardo (1990–91)
 Roque Olsen (1991), (1991–92)
 Miguel Ángel Brindisi (1991–92)
 Iñaki Sáez (1993–94)
 Paco Castellano (1994–95)
 Iñaki Sáez (1995)
 Ángel Cappa (1996–97)
 Paco Castellano (1997)
 Mariano García Remón (1997–98)
 Paco Castellano (1998–99)
 Sergije Krešić (1999–01)
 Fernando Vázquez (2001–02)
 Josu Uribe (2002–03)
 Juan Manuel Rodríguez (2003)
 David Vidal (2003–04)
 David Amaral (2004)
 Carlos Sánchez Aguiar (2004–05)
 Josip Višnjić (2005–06)
 Carlos Sánchez Aguiar (2006)
 Juanito (2006–07)
 Juan Manuel Rodríguez (2007–08)
 Javier Vidales (2008–09)
 Paco Castellano (2009)
 Sergije Krešić (2009–10)
 Paco Jémez (2010–11)
 Juan Manuel Rodríguez (2011–12)
 Sergio Lobera (2012–14)
 Josico (2014)
 Paco Herrera (2014–15)
 Quique Setién (2015–17)
 Manolo Márquez (2017)
 Pako Ayestarán (2017)
 Paco Jémez (2017–2018)
 Manolo Jiménez (2018)
 Paco Herrera (2018–2019)
 Pepe Mel (2019– 2022)

Affiliated teams
Las Palmas has used farm teams since 1954, but its official B-team, Las Palmas Atlético, was founded in 1976. A third side was founded in 2006 and reached the highest division of regional football, the Preferente, before folding in 2010 and being re-created the following season.

The club also had a women's team in the top division between 2009 and 2011. In 2010 Las Palmas founded an indoor football team for the Liga de Fútbol Indoor, staging matches at the Centro Insular de Deportes.

Crest
Las Palmas' badge is a blue shield with yellow scrolls on top with the club's name, city and archipelago. The municipal arms, granted by the city's mayor, feature in the centre of the design. Underneath lie the five crests of the clubs which united in 1949 to create the club: from left to right – Victoria, Arenas, Deportivo, Marino and Atlético; a smaller white scroll above them displays the city motto Segura tiene la palma.

In Spanish football, many clubs possess royal patronage and thus are permitted to use the prefix Real in their name and use an image of the Spanish crown. Las Palmas does not have such patronage, but tops its crest with the Spanish crown due to the patronage held by Real Club Victoria.

The crest is the central emblem of the club flag, a horizontal bicolour with yellow on top and blue underneath. The flag of the island of Gran Canaria uses these colours diagonally.

References

External links

 
Futbolme team profile 
BDFutbol team profile

 
Association football clubs established in 1949
Football clubs in the Canary Islands
Segunda División clubs
Sport in Las Palmas
1949 establishments in Spain
La Liga clubs